The dorsal calcaneocuboid ligament (superior calcaneocuboid ligament) is a thin but broad fasciculus, which passes between the contiguous surfaces of the calcaneus and cuboid, on the dorsal surface of the joint.

References 

Ligaments of the lower limb